Capp Street Project is an artist residency program that was originally located at 65 Capp Street in San Francisco, California. CSP was established as a program to nurture experimental art making in 1983  with the first visual arts residency in the United States dedicated solely to the creation and presentation of new art installations and conceptual art. The Capp Street Project name and concept has existed since 1983, although the physical space which the residency and exhibition program occupied has changed several times.

In 1998, Capp Street Project united with California College of the Arts’ Wattis Institute for Contemporary Arts. In 2014, Wattis celebrated 30 years of Capp Street Project Art.

History 

In 1983, Capp Street Project was created by Ann Hatch who acquired a David Ireland designed house at 65 Capp Street in San Francisco. Although Hatch's original intention was to preserve the house as a work of art, a personal inquiry concerning patronage and the desire to nurture non-traditional art making processes, ultimately led in another direction. The artist-in-residency program was created and became central to Capp Street Project.

Locations

65 Capp Street 
The Capp Street Project programming was initially located at 65 Capp Street in San Francisco. The house at 65 Capp Street had previously belonged to David Ireland who had purchased it in 1979 and then transformed it into an acclaimed work of minimalist architecture. In 1981 Ann Hatch acquired the house which would serve as the first home base for the non-profit artist residency which she founded in 1983.

The 500 Capp Street house was purchased in 2008 by Carlie Wilmans, in order to preserve both the house and Ireland’s work. Wilmans is on the board of the Capp Street Foundation.

Capp Street Project/AVT 
In 1989 the Capp Street Project program, still under Ann Hatch, moved to a new location that was formerly a body-shop, the AVT auto garage at 270 14th Street, San Francisco. From 1989-1993 the program used the combined name Capp Street Project/AVT.

In 1998, Capp Street Project became part of the Wattis Institute for Contemporary Arts, which is in turn part of the California College of the Arts and the house at 65 Capp Street returned to the public sector. As a program of Wattis Institute for Contemporary Arts it is currently run by Anthony Huberman, the Director since 2013. The house at 500 Capp opened to the public in 2016. Since its inception, Capp Street Project has given more than 100 local, national, and international artists the opportunity to create new work through its residency and public exhibition programs.

In 2016, the duplex next door to 65 Capp Street was purchased by Carlie Wilmans and she had made plans to also donate it to the Capp Street Project in order to create artist housing. In 2019, Wilmans attempted to evict six families, but due to public backlash the plans were stopped. As a result, the Capp Street Project foundation started to distanced itself from the founder that same year.

In 2019, the head curator of 500 Capp Street, Bob Linder was laid off in an effort to restructure the programming and lessen exhibitions by visiting artists.

Artists 

This is a list in alphabetical order by last name of artists who have participated in the Capp Street artist residency.
Maryanne Amacher (1985);
Janine Antoni;
The Art Guys (1995), a collaborative art group from Texas;
Border Arts Workshop/Taller de Arte Fronterizo (BAW/TAF) (1989), was a San Diego-based art collective included artists; Guillermo Gómez-Peña, Emily Hicks, Bertha Jottar, Richard Lou, Victor Ochoa, Robert Sanchez, Michael Schnorr and Rocío Weiss. In their 1989 exhibition Border Axes they created a communications network with modern equipment including fax machines, Xerox machines, an 800 phone line, and video equipment in hopes of dissolving the borders between the US and Mexico with alternative ways of communicating and collecting news.;
James Lee Byars;
Jim Campbell (with Marie Navarre) (1995) Unforeseeable Memories;
Maria Fernanda Cardoso;
Bruce Charlesworth (1984) the first artist-in-residency at Capp Street Project;
Mel Chin;
Willie Cole;
Elizabeth Diller and Ricardo Scofidio (1987), In the Drawing Room: versions and subversions, the collaborators—who also have an architectural practice—explored themes of domesticity, architecture, the home, and the body of the imagined resident of the installation.
Terry Fox;
Guillermo Gómez-Peña (1989), as part of the Border Art Workshop (BAW);
Joe Goode;
Ann Hamilton (1989), In Privation and Excesses, Hamilton used 700,000 pennies, among other materials, to create a poetic exploration of systems and mediums of exchange. The installation was featured on the cover of Artforum, a career-making event for the artist.;
Mona Hatoum (1996);
Mildred Howard;
Barbara Kasten;
Paul Kos (1986);
Tony Labat (1987);
Suzanne Lacy;
Hung Liu;
Liza Lou (1996)
Mary Lucier;
John Maeda (2000);
Tom Marioni (1990);
Cildo Meireles;
Celia Álvarez Muñoz (1994);
Liz Phillips;
Glen Seator (1997), Seator's approach was a full-scale indoor re-creation of the street and sidewalk outside Capp Street Project and of the street-facing facade of the gallery's first floor. Writing in the summer 1997 issue of ARTnews, critic Kenneth Baker called Seator's installation "one of the great gallery shows in this city's history." Seator's large-scale architectural installations have won international acclaim.;
Barbara T. Smith;
Fiona Templeton;
James Turrell (1984);
Bill Viola (1989) Viola's installation Sanctuary combined video, earth, and redwood trees to create an urban refuge. A renowned video artist, Viola was also awarded a prestigious MacArthur Fellowship in 1989;
Ursula von Rydingsvard;
Kara Walker (1999);
Gail Wight;
Fred Wilson;
Mel Ziegler (with Kate Ericson) (1991).

References

External links
Capp Street Project Archive
CCA Wattis Institute for Contemporary Arts
California College of the Arts

Buildings and structures in San Francisco
Art museums and galleries in San Francisco
American art
Art galleries established in 1983
1983 establishments in California
California College of the Arts
Art in the San Francisco Bay Area
Mission District, San Francisco